Rodney Peete (born March 16, 1966) is a former American football quarterback in the National Football League (NFL) for the Detroit Lions, Dallas Cowboys, Philadelphia Eagles, Washington Redskins, Oakland Raiders, and Carolina Panthers. He played college football for the University of Southern California.

Early years
Peete was born in Mesa, Arizona. He attended Sahuaro High School in Tucson. He was a three-year letterman in football, basketball, and baseball. In football, he was named the Arizona High School Player of the Year and an Academic All-American as a junior. He also contributed to his teams winning state championships in basketball and baseball.

He transferred to Shawnee Mission South High School in Overland Park, Kansas for his senior year, after his father Willie was hired as an assistant coach by the Kansas City Chiefs. He received Prep All-American honors at quarterback at the end of the season. He also was drafted in the 30th round (722nd overall) by the Toronto Blue Jays in the 1984 Major League Baseball draft, but opted to attend college instead.

In 2012, he was inducted into the Arizona Sports Hall of Fame.

College career
Peete accepted a football scholarship from the University of Southern California, because head coach Ted Tollner had given him an opportunity to play quarterback. As a redshirt freshman, he began the season as a backup quarterback behind Sean Salisbury. In the fifth game against Stanford University, he replaced Salisbury in the fourth quarter and led USC to its only touchdown in the second half, sealing a 30-6 win. Salisbury would struggle to a 4-4 record and was replaced with Peete as the starter in the ninth game against the University of Washington, which was a 20-17 loss. In the next game, he contributed to a 17-13 win against UCLA. Peete finished the season with a 2-2 record earning 50-of-85 completions (58.8%) for 566 yards, 5 passing touchdowns, 3 interceptions, 49 carries for 78 yards, and one rushing touchdown.

As a sophomore, he started all 12 games, while contributing to a 7–5 record. He completed 160-of-305 attempts (52.5%) for 2,138 yards, 10 passing touchdowns, 15 interceptions, 103 carries for 124 yards and 3 rushing touchdowns.

As a junior, he started all 12 games, while contributing to an 8-4 record. He set a school record with 5 touchdown passes against the University of Oregon. The team played in the 1988 Rose Bowl, losing 20-17 to Michigan State University. He made 197-of-332 completions (59.3%) for 2,709 yards, 21 touchdowns, 12 interceptions, 70 carries for 145 yards and 3 rushing touchdowns.

As a senior, he started all 12 games and had a 10-2 record. He posted 223-of-359 completions (62.1%) for 2,812 yards, 18 passing touchdowns, 12 interceptions, 68 carries for 68 yards and 5 rushing touchdowns. His teams would win both head-to-head matchups in the UCLA–USC rivalry against Troy Aikman's UCLA teams, with the 31–22 win being notable in that Peete was stricken with measles the week before the game and had been hospitalized. The Trojans lost 22-14 in the 1989 Rose Bowl against the University of Michigan. For his efforts, he was the second player ever and the first Trojan to win the Johnny Unitas Award as the nation's best senior quarterback (since earned by Carson Palmer and Matt Leinart as well). He was second to Barry Sanders and ahead of Aikman in the voting for the Heisman Trophy.

Peete finished his college career as the school's all-time leader in pass attempts (1,081), completions (630), passing yards (8,225), total offense (8,640) and starts (40). He also had 54 passing touchdowns, 42 interceptions, 290 carries for 415 yards and 12 rushing touchdowns.

In baseball, he played second base and shortstop as a freshman, although he was limited with a strained hamstring, he batted around .260 as part of a losing team. As a senior, he was the starter at third base, hitting .338 with 12 home runs and 46 RBIs, while receiving All-Pac-10 honors. In his three seasons of collegiate baseball, he batted .297 with 18 home runs and 84 RBIs. He was drafted three different times while at USC; in the 1988 MLB draft by the Oakland Athletics in the 14th round (359th overall), the 1989 MLB draft by the Athletics again in the 13th round (348th overall) and the 1990 MLB draft by the Detroit Tigers in the 28th round (742nd overall).

In 2009, he was inducted into the USC Athletic Hall of Fame. In 2014, he received the NCAA Silver Anniversary Award.

Professional career

Detroit Lions
Peete was selected by the Detroit Lions in the 6th round (141st overall) of the 1989 NFL Draft, after dropping because he wasn't considered to have the size or the arm talent needed to succeed in the NFL. He also joined Barry Sanders on the team.

As a rookie, Peete was scheduled to start the season opener but sprained his knee in the final preseason game against the Los Angeles Rams, missing the first 3 games of the season and being replaced with Bob Gagliano. He would have been the first rookie quarterback to start for the Lions since 1968 when Greg Landry started. He completed 17-of-31 for 268 yards, one passing touchdown, 10 carries for 78 yards, and one rushing touchdown in a 17-16 win against the Tampa Bay Buccaneers that earned him NFC Offensive Player-of-the-Week honors. He finished with 8 starts, while completing 103-of-195 attempts for 1,479 yards and 5 passing touchdowns.

In 1990, he registered 142-of-271 completions (52.4%) for 1,974 yards, 13 passing touchdowns, 48 carries for 365 yards (second on the team), and 6 rushing touchdowns. He ranked fifth in the NFC with 79.8 rating points and his interception percentage (3.0%) was the second lowest in franchise history. He had a career-high 8 carries for 97 rushing yards, including 17-of-26 completions and one rushing touchdown in the third game against the Tampa Bay Buccaneers. He suffered a pulled hamstring in the fourth game against the Green Bay Packers, which forced him to miss the next 2 contests. He returned in the seventh game against the   New Orleans Saints, contributing to a 27-10 win with 16-of-25 completions for 246 yards, one passing touchdown and 38 rushing yards. He suffered a left pulled hamstring in the next game against the Washington Redskins, leaving with a 35-21 lead that the team could not hold losing 38-41 in overtime. He missed the next 3 contests and returned to action in the fourteenth game against the Chicago Bears, helping the team score 21 first quarter points (franchise record), while throwing a career-high 4 touchdowns.

In 1991, he started the first eight games, before suffering a season ending Achilles tendon injury against the Dallas Cowboys. Peete had guided the team to a 5-2 record. He had career-highs of 25-of-38 completions, to go along with 271 yards and one passing touchdown in the 23-14 win against the Green Bay Packers. He was replaced by Erik Kramer who led the team to the NFC Championship Game against the Washington Redskins. He was placed on the injured reserve list on October 30.

In 1992, he started 10 games, making 123-of-213 completions (57.7%) for 1,702 yards and 9 passing touchdowns. In the fourth game against the Tampa Bay Buccaneers, he had 20-of-31 completions for 323 yards (career high) and one 78-yard touchdown pass. He passed for 3 touchdowns in the seventh game against the Tampa Bay Buccaneers.

In 1993, he had a career-high 62.3% completion percentage (second in franchise history), while starting 10 games. He suffered an injury in the third game that forced him to miss two contests. He still was able to lead the team to six wins in his first seven starts. He had 20-of-28 completions for 273 yards, scoring 17 fourth quarter points to overcome a 13-27 deficit and also made 93 yard touchdown pass (career high) in the eighth game against the Minnesota Vikings. He was the team's third-string quarterback behind Kramer and former Heisman Trophy winner Andre Ware for the last 4 regular season games.

Dallas Cowboys
On May 3, 1994, he signed as a free agent with the Dallas Cowboys, to replace Bernie Kosar as Troy Aikman's backup. In the seventh game against the Arizona Cardinals, Aikman suffered a concussion on the first possession and Peete replaced him throwing 2 touchdown passes in a 28-21 victory. In the eleventh game against the Washington Redskins, he substituted an injured Aikman (sprained left knee), but suffered a sprained right thumb and had to also be replaced with third-string quarterback Jason Garrett in the 31-7 win. In the thirteenth game against the Philadelphia Eagles, he started in place of an injured Aikman, tallying 172 passing yards, one touchdown and one interception in a 31-19 win. In the season finale against the New York Giants, he entered the game with 4:49 minutes left in the first half, making 6-of-8 completions for 50 yards and no touchdowns in a 15-10 loss.

Philadelphia Eagles
On April 22, 1995, he was signed as a free agent by the Philadelphia Eagles. New head coach Ray Rhodes, implemented the West Coast offense and named Peete the starter over quarterback Randall Cunningham, after the team got off to a 1-3 start. He would go on to start in 12 games with a 9-3 record, posting 215-of-375 completions (57.3%) for 2,326 yards, 8 touchdowns and 14 interceptions.

On March 14, 1996, he re-signed with the Eagles. He lost his starting job to Ty Detmer, after he tore his patella tendon. Peete started 5 games (3-2 record), making 80-of-134 completions (59.7%) for 992 yards, 3 touchdowns and 5 interceptions.

In 1998, Bobby Hoying was named the starter and the team got off to a 1-6 start. The rest of the season Koy Detmer and Peete split time at quarterback.

On April 28, 1999, he was traded to the Washington Redskins in exchange for a 2000 sixth round pick (#192-John Romero).

Washington Redskins
In 1999, he was the back up quarterback behind Brad Johnson. He appeared in 3 games, collecting 8-of-17 completions (47.1%) for 107 yards, 2 touchdowns and one interception. He became the first quarterback to throw a regular season pass for 3 different NFC East clubs.

Oakland Raiders
On July 13, 2000, he was signed by the Oakland Raiders, reuniting with head coach Jon Gruden who was his offensive coordinator with the Eagles. He was the third-string quarterback behind Rich Gannon and Bobby Hoying. He didn't appear in any game.

On September 2, 2001, he was released after being passed on the depth chart by rookie Marques Tuiasosopo. On September 29, he re-signed with the Raiders, after Hoying injured ligaments in his throwing elbow. He appeared in one game and didn't register any stat.

Carolina Panthers
On March 28, 2002, he was signed as a free agent by the Carolina Panthers. At 37 years old, Peete's career appeared to be over until he was named the starter over Chris Weinke, leading the team to a 3–0 start and ultimately finish with a 7–9 record, an improvement over 1–15 the year before. He registered career highs of 14 starts, 223-of-381 completions, 2,630 passing yards, 15 passing touchdowns, 14 interceptions and a passer rating of 77.4.

In 2003, after a weak showing in the first half of the season opener against the Jacksonville Jaguars, head coach John Fox replaced him in the third quarter with Jake Delhomme, who then led the Panthers to a comeback victory. Delhomme replaced Peete as starting quarterback for the rest of the season, leading the team to an 11–5 record and the Super Bowl XXXVIII game against the New England Patriots.

On February 28, 2005, he was released for salary cap reasons, but he chose to retire instead of re-signing with the Panthers for another season with a lower salary.  Peete finished his career with the most NFL career passing yards among quarterbacks from USC, a record that was eventually eclipsed by Carson Palmer.

Peete finished his career with 1,344 completions in 2,346 attempts, for 16,338 passing yards, 76 passing touchdowns, 92 interceptions and a passer rating of 73.3.

Entertainment career
After his retirement from the NFL, Peete became one of the hosts of the Fox Sports Networks sports talk show The Best Damn Sports Show Period alongside John Salley, Chris Rose, and Rob Dibble. In 2015, the Oprah Winfrey Network announced that they were making a docuseries on Peete and his family.

Rodney Peete and his wife Holly Robinson Peete star in Lipozene commercials on television.

In 2019, Rodney Peete co-hosted the Hallmark Kitten Bowl.

Rodney Peete currently serves as co-host (alongside former KNBC sportscaster Fred Roggin) of Roggin and Rodney, on Los Angeles sports radio station KLAC radio (570AM), focusing on Southern California sports.

Personal life

Peete has been married to actress Holly Robinson Peete since 1995. They have four children. One of their children was diagnosed with autism at age three. He discusses his relationship with his autistic child in the June 2010 issue of Men's Health.

Peete is the son of Willie Peete, former running backs coach of the Kansas City Chiefs and Chicago Bears. His brother is NFL coach Skip Peete. He is the son-in-law of late actor Matt Robinson, and the cousin of the late professional golfer Calvin Peete.

See also
 Racial issues faced by black quarterbacks

References

African-American players of American football
American football quarterbacks
Players of American football from Arizona
Detroit Lions players
Dallas Cowboys players
Philadelphia Eagles players
Washington Redskins players
All-American college football players
Oakland Raiders players
Carolina Panthers players
USC Trojans football players
USC Trojans baseball players
Sahuaro High School alumni
American radio personalities
1966 births
Living people
21st-century African-American people
20th-century African-American people